The Haikou-Ledong Expressway, designated as G9811 and commonly referred to as the Haile Expressway, is  located in Haikou, Hainan, China. Until 2022, the route ran further to Sanya, but due to difficulty in land acquisition south of Ledong, the route was shortened to Ledong.

Segmentation Introduction 
 Haitun section (Haikou-Tunchang): 72.03 kilometers in length, started in 2010, and officially opened to traffic on 29 December 2012.
 Tunqiong Section (Tunchang-Qiongzhong): A total length of 46.85 kilometers, which started on May 31, 2012, and was officially opened to traffic on May 30, 2015.
 Qiongle section (Qiongzhong-Wuzhishan-Ledong): 127.329 kilometers in length, opened to traffic on September 28, 2018.

References

Chinese national-level expressways
Expressways in Hainan
Transport in Hainan